Electoral district of Heidelberg was an electoral district of the Legislative Assembly in the Australian state of Victoria.

Members for Heidelberg

Election results

References

Former electoral districts of Victoria (Australia)
1927 establishments in Australia
1945 disestablishments in Australia